Pterostylis umbrina, commonly known as the broad-sepaled leafy greenhood, is a plant in the orchid family Orchidaceae and is endemic to the Australian Capital Territory and New South Wales on the Southern Tablelands. As with similar greenhoods, plants in flower differ from those that are not. Those not in flower have a rosette  of leaves flat on a short stalk. Plants in flower have up to six green flowers with darker green stripes with stem leaves but lack a rosette.

Description
Pterostylis diminuta, is a terrestrial,  perennial, deciduous, herb with an underground tuber. The dorsal sepal and petals are joined to form a hood called the "galea" over the column. The galea is green with darker green stripes and a curved, orange-brown tip. Flowering occurs from August to October.

Taxonomy and naming
The broad-sepaled leafy greenhood was first formally described in 2006 by David Jones and Mark Clements and given the name Bunochilus umbrinus. The description was published in Australian Orchid Research from a specimen collected in the Australian Capital Territory. In 2007, Gary Backhouse changed the name to Pterostylis umbrina. The specific epithet (umbrina) is a Latin word meaning "dull brown", referring to the colour of the labellum compared to P. macrosepala.

Distribution and habitat
Pterostylis umbrina occurs on Black Mountain in the Australian Capital Territory and in disjunct populations in New South Wales between Burrinjuck and Tumut. It grows in forest with grasses and shrubs.

References

umbrina
Orchids of New South Wales
Orchids of the Australian Capital Territory
Plants described in 2006